The International Journal of the Platonic Tradition is a biannual peer-reviewed open access academic journal of philosophy published by Brill Publishers under the auspices of the International Society for Neoplatonic Studies. It was established in 1985 and the editor-in-chief is John F. Finamore (University of Iowa). The journal is abstracted and indexed in the Humanities International Index, International Review of Biblical Studies, and Scopus.

External links 
 

Philosophy journals
Publications established in 1985
English-language journals
Biannual journals
Brill Publishers academic journals
Creative Commons Attribution-licensed journals
Works about Platonism